Thora Sa Haq is a 2019 Pakistani romantic drama television series started airing on ARY Digital from 23 October 2019. It is produced by Abdullah Seja under their banner Idream Entertainment. Ayeza Khan and Imran Abbas are playing the leading roles in their fourth on-screen appearance after Tum Kon Piya (2016), Mohabbat Tumse Nafrat Hai (2017) and Koi Chand Rakh (2018). It is digitally available on YouTube and in some countries on VIU App.

Plot 
Seher is a beautiful and simple girl who lives in Hyderabad with her father. She is getting married because of her father's ailing health.

Zamin and Hareem are two cousins who live in the same house and love each other dearly. They have been engaged. Aijaz (Seher's father) was thrown out of the house after he refused to marry Rabia's sister. However Waqar keeps contact with him and goes to Seher's marriage where they get to know that the groom has run away. Aijaz gets a heart attack and then pleads to his brother. Waqar tells him not to worry as Zamin will marry Seher. Their marriage was done forcefully. After hearing the vows, Aijaz dies. Waqar takes Seher to his own house where she is ill-treated by Rabia due to what her father did years ago. Zamin and Seher keep their nikkah secret and story takes a new turn when Hareem learns of their marriage. In the end, Seher is pregnant.

Cast
Ayeza Khan as Seher Zamin Ahmad
Imran Abbas Naqvi as Zamin Ahmad
Mashal Khan as Hareem Iftikhar
Saba Faisal as Rabia Begum, Hareem's mother 
Behroze Sabzwari as Waqar Ahmed
Firdous Jamal as Iftikhar Ahmed, Hareem's father
Nida Mumtaz as Munazzah, Zamin's mother 
Hina Sheikh as Shamsa Khala, Seher's neighbour 
Saba Zahid as Zobia, Shamsa's daughter
Shan Baig as  Rafay, Hareem's maternal cousin 
Saira Ghaffar as Farzana 
Mehmood Akhter as Aijaz Ahmed, Seher's father

Nominations

References 

2019 Pakistani television series debuts
2020 Pakistani television series endings
ARY Digital original programming
Pakistani romantic drama television series
Urdu-language television shows